Pleasant Plain is an unincorporated community in Jefferson Township, Huntington County, Indiana.

History
Pleasant Plain was founded in 1875. It was likely named from its scenic setting. A post office was established at Pleasant Plain in 1875, and remained in operation until it was discontinued in 1905.

Geography

References

Unincorporated communities in Huntington County, Indiana
Unincorporated communities in Indiana